Mingalarbar is a Burmese television morning show which is airing on MRTV-4. The show has been airing since 2013.

Broadcast format
Up to five sections from following are discussed per day.
Host Choice, Hand Made, Health, Movie Review, Cooking (Every day), Art, Education, Technology, Beauty Tips, Work out, Talk with celebrities, Travelling guide, etc..

References

External links

Burmese television series
MRTV (TV network) original programming